Kitty and the Great Big World is a 1956 West German comedy film directed by Alfred Weidenmann and starring Romy Schneider, Karlheinz Böhm, and O.E. Hasse. It is a remake of the 1939 film Kitty and the World Conference.

Cast
 Romy Schneider as Kitty Dupont
 Karlheinz Böhm as Robert Ashlin
 O.E. Hasse as Sir William Ashlin
 Ernst Schröder as Mr. Crawford - Sekretär
 Paul Dahlke as Herr Dupont
 Alice Treff as Frau Dupont
 Peer Schmidt as Boris Malewsky - Reporter
 Ina Peters as Jeanette
 Charles Regnier as Monsieur Jeannot
 Martin Andreas as Ein Fischerjunge
 Ernst Waldow as Herr Franz
 Hans Hermann Schaufuß as Armand
 Sammy Drechsel as Rundfunkreporter
 Heini Göbel as Fotoreporter
 Fritz Lafontaine as Geschäftsführer
 Eduard Linkers as Gastjaiswort
 Rainer Penkert as Hopkins
 Rudolf Rhomberg as Bistrowirt
 Willy Rösner
 Wolfgang Völz as Steel
 Sigfrit Steiner

References

Bibliography

External links 
 

1956 films
1956 comedy films
German comedy films
West German films
1950s German-language films
Films directed by Alfred Weidenmann
Remakes of German films
Films set in Switzerland
1950s German films